The 2012 Ohio Valley Conference men's basketball tournament began on February 29 and ended on March 3 with Murray State claiming the conference's automatic bid to the NCAA tournament.  All games were held at Nashville Municipal Auditorium in Nashville, Tennessee.

Format
The format for the tournament was changed, beginning with the 2011 tournament. Seeding changed to a merit-based system where the No. 1 and 2 seeds received a double bye to the semifinals while the No. 3 and 4 seeds earned a single bye to the quarterfinals (a system that has been used since 2003 in the West Coast Conference). The first round matched the No. 5/8 and No. 6/7 seeds The top eight eligible men's basketball teams in the Ohio Valley Conference received berths in the conference tournament.  After the 16-game conference season, teams were seeded by conference record.  The winner earns an automatic berth in the 2012 NCAA tournament.

SIU Edwardsville was ineligible for the conference tournament, due to its transition to Division I.

Seeds
The top eight qualified for the tournament. Teams were seeded by record within the conference, with a tiebreaker system to seed teams with identical conference records.

Bracket

References

Tournament
Ohio Valley Conference men's basketball tournament
Ohio Valley Conference men's basketball tournament
Ohio Valley Conference men's basketball tournament
Ohio Valley Conference men's basketball tournament
Basketball competitions in Nashville, Tennessee
College sports tournaments in Tennessee